Jonaki is a village in Poland.

Jonaki may also refer to:

The Jonaki era in the history of Assamese literature
Jonaki (magazine), an Assamese language magazine
Jonaki (film), a Bengali drama film